Migsideres bialbomaculata is a species of beetle in the family Cerambycidae, and the only species in the genus Migsideres. It was described by Gilmour in 1948.

References

Lamiini
Beetles described in 1948